Peter Gerard Vasely (born 1967) is a United States Navy rear admiral who serves as deputy director for future joint force development of the Joint Staff since June 3, 2022. He served as a special assistant to the Director of the Navy Staff from November 4, 2021 to June 3, 2022. Before that, he served as the Commander of Special Operations Joint Task Force–Afghanistan and NATO Special Operations Component Command–Afghanistan from May 17, 2021 to August 31, 2021. Vasely is a Navy SEAL officer and former member of SEAL Team ONE and Development Group. Previously, he served as the Director of Operations of the Defense Intelligence Agency from November 2019 to 2021.

Raised in Coronado, California, Vasely graduated from Coronado High School in 1985. He then attended the Northfield Mt. Hermon Prep School, graduating in 1986 before entering the United States Naval Academy.

Vasely is the son of Edward J. Vasely (born February 22, 1925) and Jean Frances (Cahill) Vasely (December 7, 1927 – June 4, 2018). His father served in the U.S. Coast Guard during World War II. The couple were married on June 17, 1950 in Mount Vernon, New York. They had two daughters, four sons, eight grandchildren and, as of 2018, eight great-grandchildren. Vasely married Deanne Maree Clarke on January 21, 2000 in Escambia County, Florida. They have a son and a daughter.

Military career
Vasely earned a B.S. degree in general engineering from the Naval Academy in 1990 and received a commission as an Ensign in the United States Navy. He volunteered for Basic Underwater Demolition/SEAL training graduating with BUD/S class 172 in February 1991. 
His first operational assignment was with SEAL Team ONE in at Naval Amphibious Base Coronado.
Following SEAL Tactical Training (STT) and completion of six month probationary period, he received the 1130 designator as a Naval Special Warfare Officer, entitled to wear the Special Warfare insignia also known as "SEAL Trident". Vasely served as assistant platoon commander and platoon commander during deployments to Southeast Asia. In 1995, Vasely volunteered for assignment to Naval Special Warfare Development Group in Damneck, Virginia, and completed a specialized selection and training course. He then served with the command until 1998 during which time he planned, rehearsed and operated during classified operations. Vasely served as executive officer with SBU-22 from 1998 to 2000, followed by a tour with Joint Special Operations Command from 2000 to 2002. Vasely returned to Naval Special Warfare Development Group in August 2002 as squadron commander till 2005, completing deployments in Afghanistan during Operation Enduring Freedom. He later received an M.S. degree in joint warfighting and strategic studies from the Joint Advanced Warfighting School. 
His later staff assignments and joint tours include: Operations Officer, Joint Special Operations Command (JSOC), Branch Chief and Operations Officer at Joint Staff/Deputy Director for Special Operations (137-DDSO), Deputy Director for Operations, Director of Operations at JSOC, and Deputy Commanding Officer of Naval Special Warfare Development Group. As a Captain, Vasely was assigned as Commander, Naval Special Warfare Group Two where he organized, equipped, deployed, and sustained NSW forces in support of Theater Special Operations Commands in AFRICOM, EUCOM, SOUTHCOM, and CENTCOM.

Vasely was assigned to command U.S. Forces Afghanistan Forward in July 2021. He was promoted to his current rank on April 1, 2021.

In April 2021, it was announced that Vasely would be assigned as deputy director for joint training of the Joint Staff.

Awards and decorations
His personal awards and decorations include the Defense Superior Service Medal (two awards), Legion of Merit (two awards), Bronze Star with "V" distinguishing device (four awards), Defense Meritorious Service Medal (three awards), the Meritorious Service Medal, Joint Commendation Medal (three awards), Navy and Marine Corps Commendation Medal (two awards), Navy and Marine Corps Achievement Medal, Presidential Unit Citation (two awards), and various campaign, unit, and service awards.

References

External links

1967 births
Living people
Place of birth missing (living people)
People from Coronado, California
Northfield Mount Hermon School alumni
United States Naval Academy alumni
United States Navy SEALs personnel
Joint Forces Staff College alumni
SEAL Team Six personnel
Recipients of the Legion of Merit
United States Navy admirals
Recipients of the Defense Superior Service Medal
Military personnel from California